Current Opinion in Neurology is a bimonthly peer-reviewed medical journal covering neurology. The journal publishes editorials and reviews, but not original research articles. It is published by Lippincott Williams & Wilkins and the editor-in-chief is Richard S.J. Frackowiak (University College London). The journal was established in 1988 as Current Opinion in Neurology and Neurosurgery and obtained its current name in 1993.

Abstracting and indexing 
The journal is abstracted and indexed in Index medicus/MEDLINE/PubMed, Science Citation Index, Current Contents/Clinical Medicine, and BIOSIS Previews. According to the Journal Citation Reports and Resurchify, the journal has a 2020 impact factor of 4.88.

See also
Current Opinion (Lippincott Williams & Wilkins)

References

External links 
 

Neurology journals
Publications established in 1988
Bimonthly journals
Lippincott Williams & Wilkins academic journals
English-language journals